Mary Stone may refer to:

Mary Stone (doctor) (1873–1954), also known as Shi Meiyu, a Chinese medical doctor
Mary Jean Stone (1853–1908), English historical writer
Mary Page Stone (1865–1912), medical doctor in the State of Victoria, Australia
Mary Perry Stone, American painter, sculptor, and muralist
Maggie Stone, Mary Margaret Stone, fictional character